The 1975 Citizen's Classic, also known as the Hong Kong Open, was a men's tennis tournament played on outdoor hard courts in Hong Kong. It was the third edition of the event and was held from 10 November through 16 November 1975. The tournament was part of the Grade B tier of the 1975 Grand Prix tennis circuit. Unseeded Tom Gorman won the singles title.

Finals

Singles
 Tom Gorman defeated  Sandy Mayer 6–3, 6–1, 6–1
 It was Gorman's 2nd singles title of the year and the 5th of his career.

Doubles
 Tom Okker /  Ken Rosewall defeated  Bob Carmichael /  Sandy Mayer 6–3, 6–4

References

External links
 ITF tournament edition details

Viceroy Classic
1975 in Hong Kong
Tennis in Hong Kong